Elizaveta Vasilyevna Oshurkova (born 19 June 1991) is a Ukrainian-born Russian racing cyclist, who last rode for UCI Women's Team .

Career
In 2009, she won bronze at the 2009 UEC European Track Championships in junior women's team pursuit. She competed in the 2013 UCI women's road race in Florence.

In July 2016, Oshurkova started competing for Russia.

References

External links
 
 Elizaveta Oshurkova at Cogeas–Mettler Cycling Team's official website
 Elizaveta Oshurkova at World Cycling Stats

1991 births
Living people
Ukrainian female cyclists
Russian female cyclists
Place of birth missing (living people)
Ukrainian emigrants to Russia
Naturalised citizens of Russia
European Games competitors for Russia
Cyclists at the 2019 European Games